Thelaziidae is a family of spirurian nematodes, which form the mid-sized lineage of the superfamily Thelazioidea. Like all nematodes, they have neither a circulatory nor a respiratory system.

They number 7 genera or so, with a few dozen species all together. Mostly parasites of birds, a few have also been found in other vertebrates.

Systematics
The subfamily Oxyspirurinae is monotypic, as are several little-known genera in the Thelaziinae; these all might not be valid. All together, the systematic layout of this family is liable to change and cannot be considered more than tentative.

Subfamily Oxyspirurinae Skrjabin, 1916
 Oxyspirura Dräsche in Stossich, 1897

Subfamily Thelaziinae Skrjabin, 1915
 Ceratospira Schneider, 1866
 Hempelia Vaz, 1937
 Pancreatonema McVicar & Gibson, 1975
 Pericyema Railliet, 1925
 Thelazia Bosc in Blainville, 1819
 Thylaconema Chandler, 1929

Footnotes

References 
  (2007): Family Thelaziidae. Version of 2007-AUG-07. Retrieved 2008-NOV-05.

Spirurida
Nematode families